The Torrijos railway station is railway station owned by ADIF that serves the Spanish municipality of Torrijos, province of Toledo.

History 
The 2-storey historicist station—built in granite and featuring round-arch windows and doors— was inaugurated on 20 June 1876, by means of the opening of the 85.42 kilometre-long Madrid–Torrijos stretch of the Madrid–Extremadura line. Soon after, the Torrijos–Talavera de la Reina stretch (48.76 km), was inaugurated on 13 July 1876.

At 17:40 on 14 January 2019, a derailment (with no injuries) occurred 500 metres from the station. According to Renfe, it was a case of sabotage.

See also 
 Madrid−Valencia de Alcántara railway

References 
Citations

Bibliography
 

Buildings and structures in the Province of Toledo
Railway stations in Castilla–La Mancha
Railway stations in Spain opened in 1876